Sabri bin Azit is a Malaysian politician who has served as Member of Parliament (MP) for Jerai since May 2018 and Chairman of the Translation and Book Institute effective since May 2020. He is a member of the Malaysian Islamic Party (PAS), a component party of the Perikatan Nasional (PN) coalition.

Election results

Honours
 :
  Companion of the Order of Loyalty to the Crown of Malaysia (JSM) (2021)

References

Living people
Malaysian Islamic Party politicians
Place of birth missing (living people)
21st-century Malaysian politicians
Members of the Dewan Rakyat
1966 births